Parvulastra exigua, or the dwarf cushion star is a species of sea star in the family Asterinidae. It can be found in temperate intertidal marine communities from geographically widespread sites around the southern hemisphere (including South Africa and Australia).

Description
Parvulastra exigua has pentagonal body with no obvious protruding arms. Dorsal surface is tiled with a small cluster of spines at each tile. Colour is variegated, with bright patterns in orange, brown, green and white.

Distribution
Parvulastra exigua is found from Namibia to Mozambique on intertidal zones up to 3 m, on St Helena, St Paul, and southeastern Australia.

Natural history
Parvulastra exigua occurs in the intertidal zone and slightly deeper, and is well camouflaged. It feeds on microscopic algae by everting stomach onto substrate. No planktonic larval stage is present.

References

Asterinidae
Fauna of the Atlantic Ocean
Fauna of the Indian Ocean
Fauna of the Pacific Ocean
Animals described in 1816
Taxa named by Jean-Baptiste Lamarck